Park Yeon-jeong (Hangul: 박연정; born January 19, 2006) is a South Korean figure skater. She is the 2021 CS Cup of Austria silver medalist and 2021 U.S. Classic silver medalist. On the junior level, she is the 2019 JGP United States silver medalist and the 2019 South Korean junior national champion.

Personal life 
Park was born on January 19, 2006, in Seoul, South Korea.

Career

Early career 
Park began skating in 2013. She is the 2019 South Korean junior national champion. Park is considered part of the second generation of "Yuna Kids," South Korean ladies who began skating after being inspired by 2010 Olympic Champion Yuna Kim.

2019–2020 season 
Park placed fifth in the Korean Junior Grand Prix selection competition in July to earn two JGP quotas. At her first Junior Grand Prix event in the United States, she won silver behind American Alysa Liu and ahead of Russia's Anastasia Tarakanova. Park was the first Korean lady to medal in her JGP debut since Yuna Kim in 2004. She finished fifth at her second event in Italy and did not qualify for the 2019–20 Junior Grand Prix Final. Park competed at the senior level at the 2020 South Korean Championships and finished ninth.

2020–2021 season 
Due to the COVID-19 pandemic, the 2020–21 ISU Junior Grand Prix series, where Park would have competed, was cancelled. With international competitive opportunities limited for South Korean skaters, Park finished eighth at the 2021 South Korean Championships.

2021–2022 season 
Park did not compete on the 2021–22 ISU Junior Grand Prix series, instead opting to make her senior international debut at the 2021 U.S. International Classic. She earned the silver medal at the event by four points behind Russian Alexandra Trusova. Competing on the Challenger series, Park won the silver medal at the 2021 CS Cup of Austria. On November 8 she was assigned to make her Grand Prix debut at the 2021 Internationaux de France, replacing Maïa Mazzara. She finished eighth at the event.

2022–2023 season 
After winning gold at the SEA Open Trophy, Park made her senior Grand Prix debut at the 2022 Skate America, finishing in eighth place.

Programs

Competitive highlights 
GP: Grand Prix; CS: Challenger Series; JGP: Junior Grand Prix

Detailed results

Senior Level

Junior Level

References

External links 
 
 

2006 births
Living people
South Korean female single skaters
Figure skaters from Seoul
Medalists at ISU championships
Female sports medalists